Sylvester Tetteh (born 7 July 1977) is a Ghanaian Politician. He is a member of the Eighth Parliament of the Fourth Republic of Ghana representing the Bortianor-Ngleshie Amanfro Constituency in the Ga South Municipal District in the Greater Accra Region of Ghana. He was the former Chief Executive Officer of  National Youth Authority (NYA).

Early Life and Career 
Tetteh was born on 7 July 1977. He hails from Old Ningo. He is a graduate of Regent University College of Science and Technology where he was awarded a Bachelor of Science marketing in 2010. In 2019, he was appointed as the Chief Executive Officer of  National Youth Authority (NYA) to replace Mr Emmanuel Sin-nyet Asigri, who was sacked because of procurement breaches.

Politics 
Tetteh is a member of the New Patriotic party. In the 2012 and 2016 General elections, he contested and lost the Ningo-Prampram constituency seat  against Enoch Teye Mensah and Samuel Nartey George of the NDC respectively. In the 2020 NPP parliamentary primaries, Tetteh switch from Ningo-Prampram to contest in Bortianor-Ngleshie Amanfro, where he resides. He won against Habib Saad the incumbent member of parliament. He won the general elections.

Committees 
He serves as the Vice Chairperson and a member of Communication Committee and  Local Government and Rural Development Committee respectively in the Eighth Parliament of the Fourth Republic of Ghana.

In September 2021, he was appointed the Board Chairperson of the Board Chairman of the Ghana Enterprise Agency by President Nana Akuffo-Addo .

Personal life 
He is a Christian

References 

Living people
1977 births
Ghanaian MPs 2021–2025
People from Greater Accra Region
New Patriotic Party politicians
Ga-Adangbe people